Francesco de Accolti was a Roman Catholic prelate who served as Bishop of Ancona e Numana (1514–1523).

Biography
On 5 Apr 1514, Francesco de Accolti was appointed during the papacy of Pope Leo X as Bishop of Ancona e Numana.
He served as Bishop of Ancona e Numana until his resignation in 1523.

References

External links and additional sources
 (for Chronology of Bishops) 
 (for Chronology of Bishops)  

16th-century Italian Roman Catholic bishops
Bishops appointed by Pope Leo X